The Physicians Committee for Responsible Medicine (PCRM) is a non-profit research and advocacy organization based in Washington, D.C., which promotes a plant-based diet, preventive medicine, and alternatives to animal research, and encourages what it describes as "higher standards of ethics and effectiveness in research." Its tax filing shows its activities as "prevention of cruelty to animals."

Founded in 1985 by Neal Barnard, PCRM says that it "combines the clout and expertise of more than 12,000 physicians with the dedicated actions of 150,000 members across the United States and around the world." Its primary activities include emphasizing nutrition in medical education, conducting research into healthy diets, educating people about nutrition, "shifting research from animal 'models' to human-relevant studies," and promoting "alternatives to chemical tests on animals."

Campaigns

Healthy hospital food 
The PCRM releases an annual report ranking the healthfulness of hospital food. It also encourages hospitals to replace fast food with more healthful options. In January 2016, PCRM placed billboards that read "Eat more chickpeas" near hospitals with Chick-fil-As. In May 2016, it spoke before the board of Grady Memorial Hospital in Atlanta and erected billboards that read "Ask your local hospital to go #FastFoodFree." In June 2016, Grady announced that its McDonald's was shutting down.

2015–2020 Dietary Guidelines for Americans 
When the Dietary Guidelines Advisory Committee (DGAC) announced in February 2015 that "cholesterol is not a nutrient of concern for overconsumption", the PCRM began working to keep cholesterol warnings in the 2015 Dietary Guidelines for Americans. In March 2015, Neal Barnard presented oral testimony at the National Institutes of Health, stating: "for all its good work, the Committee made a scientific error on cholesterol and to carry this glaring mistake into the Guidelines is not scientifically defensible". In October 2015, the PCRM placed billboards reading "#CholesterolKills" near the Texas home offices of Agriculture Committee chairman K. Michael Conaway. In January 2016, the PCRM filed a lawsuit alleging that the DGAC recommended dropping limits on dietary cholesterol, motivated by industry pressure, according to documents recovered by the PCRM under the Freedom of Information Act.

The 2015–2020 Dietary Guidelines for Americans, released in January 2016, retained recommendations for Americans to limit cholesterol consumption. On March 23, 2016, Neal Barnard told The Washington Post that he liked that "the guidelines reinstated the advice to eat as little cholesterol as possible and finally called out a vegetarian eating pattern as one of three healthy options".

Wayne State University dog experiments 
Since 2011, the PCRM has urged Wayne State University to end its heart failure experiments on dogs. According to a 2015 review article by PCRM doctors in the American Journal of Translational Research: "insights gleaned from decades of animal-based research efforts have not been proportional to research success in terms of deciphering human heart failure and developing effective therapeutics for human patients". In 2015, actor and Wayne State alumna Lily Tomlin joined the PCRM in urging Wayne State to end its dog experiments. In September 2015, the PCRM placed billboards in Detroit that told the story of one of the dogs who died in the experiments.

Ending medical school live animal laboratories
On June 30, 2016, The Washington Post reported that the University of Tennessee—the last remaining school to use animals—e-mailed the PCRM that "effective immediately, the University of Tennessee College of Medicine Chattanooga has ceased to provide surgical skills training for medical students using live animal models". Over the years, the Physicians Committee demonstrated and placed billboards leading to the decision. The University of Tennessee's announcement followed the decision by the Johns Hopkins University School of Medicine to end live animal use in its surgery-skills training. In 2014, PCRM members had demonstrated outside the university. In February 2016, the PCRM worked with Maryland State Delegate Shane Robinson to introduce a bill to end the practice in Maryland. On May 18, 2016, The Baltimore Sun reported that Johns Hopkins University School of Medicine would stop using live animals.

Chemical testing
Since 2007, the PCRM has urged reform of the Toxic Substances Control Act of 1976. On June 22, 2015, President Barack Obama signed into law the Frank R. Lautenberg Chemical Safety for the 21st Century Act, which contains language requiring chemical companies and the Environmental Protection Agency to replace and reduce animal tests and increase the use of human-relevant methods. The Physicians Committee supported passage of this law.

Atkins Diet
The PCRM promotes plant-based diets as beneficial. The PCRM highlights what it says are the health benefits of avoiding dairy products and campaigns for plant-based meals in schools. The New York Times writes that, in 2004, the PCRM passed Robert Atkins's postmortem medical report to The Wall Street Journal. The report, obtained by Richard Fleming of the Fleming Heart and Health Institute, showed that Atkins himself had experienced heart attack, congestive heart failure, and weighed 258 pounds. Atkins supporters countered that there was no reason to suppose that his heart problem (cardiomyopathy) was diet-related, and that the PCRM had received the coroner's report in violation of federal law.

Action against fast food
The organization's nutrition director in 2004, Amy Lanou criticized the U.S. Department of Agriculture for promoting high-fat, high-calorie products, such as certain brands of cookies and fast-food products. Susan M. Levin, the PCRM's director of nutrition education, sent a letter in March 2009 to the minor league baseball team, the West Michigan Whitecaps, to object to a four-pound, 4,800-calorie hamburger on the team's concession-stand menu, and to ask that the team put a label on the burger indicating that it was a "dietary disaster". The PCRM has also spoken out against the Las Vegas restaurant Heart Attack Grill. Its menu offers hamburgers containing more than 9,000 calories; a diner has been hospitalized, and the unofficial spokesman died of a heart attack.

The Physicians Committee advertising campaign "I was lovin' it", a spoof of the McDonald's advertising slogan "I'm lovin' it", was used in a September 2010 advertising campaign encouraging consumers to adopt a vegetarian diet to avoid the health risks associated with the high levels of dietary fat, cholesterol, and sodium in McDonald's food. The campaign launched in the Washington, D.C., area showed a grieving woman in a morgue, as the camera circled around a middle-aged man draped in a white sheet and clutching a partially-eaten hamburger. The group highlighted the high levels of fat and sodium in products such as the "Double quarter pounder with cheese extra value meal", which at the time contained 61 grams of fat and 1,650 milligrams of sodium. The group chose Washington, D.C., as the first city for the campaign because it had the second-highest rate of deaths associated with heart disease. McDonald's called the ad "outrageous, misleading and unfair", and encouraged customers "to put such outlandish propaganda in perspective, and to make food and lifestyle choices that are right for them." The National Restaurant Association called such ads misleading, saying that they unnecessarily focus on a single item to "distort the reality that the nation's restaurants are serving an increasing array of healthful menu choices."

Reception

Relationship with animal rights groups
PCRM has had a long standing relationship with People for the Ethical Treatment of Animals (PETA), including receiving $1.3M from PETA. Barnard and PETA's Ingrid Newkirk both were on the board of Foundation to Support Animal Protection (also known as PETA Foundation), and FSAP did the accounting for both PETA and PCRM. Barnard did not deny that there is a relationship with PETA during an interview with The New York Times in 2004.

PCRM has had ties with Stop Huntingdon Animal Cruelty (SHAC)—Jerry Vlasak was a former spokesman for PCRM and Barnard co-signed a letter with Kevin Kjonaas to hundreds of bosses of companies involved with Huntingdon on PCRM letterhead. SHAC has been called a domestic terrorist threat by the U.S. Department of Justice.

The Center for Consumer Freedom, which represents the interests of restaurants and food companies, considers PCRM to be a front for PETA, saying that "its food rankings reflect that agenda" of opposing meat and dairy products, and "they do a very slick job of obscuring their real intentions".

American Medical Association
The American Medical Association (AMA) has criticized PCRM’s positions. In 1990, the AMA adopted a resolution condemning PCRM’s activism against the use of animals in research, objecting to PCRM "implying that physicians who support the use of animals in biomedical research are irresponsible, for misrepresenting the critical role animals play in research and teaching, and for obscuring the overwhelming support for such research which exists among practicing physicians in the United States."

Barnard objected in the Journal of the American Medical Association to a December 1991 article by Jerod Loeb of the AMA that said the group had "officially censured" PCRM. Barnard wrote: "Censure is used by the American Medical Association (AMA) for specific purposes, and PCRM has never been the subject of any such proceeding." Loeb replied that "[t]he term 'officially censured' refers to a resolution adopted by the AMA House of Delegates in June 1990" and that the resolution "was passed without dissenting vote".

In a 1991 news release, the AMA said that PCRM's dietary advice promoting vegetarianism "could be dangerous to the health and well-being of Americans". The statement, reaffirmed in 2000, states that the AMA objects to PCRM "implying that physicians who support the use of animals in biomedical research are irresponsible, for misrepresenting the critical role animals play in research and teaching, and for obscuring the overwhelming support for such research which exists among practicing physicians in the United States."

According to Barnard, the disagreements between PCRM and the AMA are in the past; he said in 2017 that his articles are published by AMA journals and that he had addressed a recent AMA annual conference.

See also
 List of animal rights groups
 List of vegetarian organizations

References

External links

Medical and health organizations based in Washington, D.C.
Medical associations based in the United States
Animal rights movement
Plant-based diet organizations
Organizations established in 1985
Non-profit organizations based in the United States
1985 establishments in the United States